Fintan Gavin (born ) is an Irish Roman Catholic prelate who has served as Bishop of Cork and Ross since 2019.

Early life and education 
Gavin was born in Dublin on 1 January 1966, to Michael and Angela Gavin, and baptised in St Andrew's Church, Westland Row on 5 January. He grew up in Marino, where he played hurling and football with St Vincent's GAA and was a member of Marino Athletic Club.

Prior to his seminary formation in Holy Cross College, Gavin had begun training as a residential social worker in Our Lady's Hostel, Eccles Street, from September 1983 to August 1984. During his seminary formation, he trained at Liberty Hall, the Northlands addiction treatment counselling centre in Derry, and St Patrick's University Hospital.

Gavin was ordained a deacon for the Archdiocese of Dublin by the Archbishop of Dublin, Desmond Connell, in the Church of the Holy Cross, Clonliffe, on 11 March 1990, and gained summer parish experience at Brentwood Cathedral, Essex. He was subsequently ordained a priest for the Archdiocese of Dublin by Auxiliary Bishop of Dublin, Éamonn Walsh, in St Vincent de Paul Church, Marino, on 7 June 1991.

Presbyteral ministry 
Following ordination, Gavin's first pastoral assignment was as curate in Holy Redeemer parish, Bray, where he also served as a teacher at St Thomas' Community College and chaplain to St Gerard's Junior and Senior School, and completed a higher diploma in education from University College Dublin. Gavin was appointed curate in Sacred Heart parish, Killinarden, Tallaght, in 1994, where he also served as a teacher at the local community school, while also gaining summer pastoral experience in Coram, New York between 1992 and 1995.

Gavin moved to Rome in 1996 to complete a licentiate in canon law from the Pontifical Gregorian University in 1999, and subsequently a doctorate in 2002, with a specialisation in rotal jurisprudence. During his postgraduate studies, Gavin assisted at parishes in Florence and Benidorm through both summer and migrant ministries. He also gained summer pastoral experience in Argentina, working with an indigenous community in Patagonia and accompanying a group of Italian university students on a mission experience in the Diocese of San Miguel.

Gavin returned to Dublin in 2002, where he was appointed curate in St Andrew's Church, Westland Row. During his time in Westland Row, he collaborated in a pastoral initiative centred around inviting and encouraging those who had drifted away to return to the church.

Gavin was appointed vice-chancellor of the Archdiocese of Dublin in 2003.

He was appointed parish chaplain in Our Lady of Victories parish, Ballymun Road, in 2010, serving as part of the parish grouping centred around Ballygall, Drumcondra and Glasnevin. During his time in Our Lady of Victories parish, Gavin developed the parish gospel choir to lead a Sunday evening Mass in the parish that was aimed at young people.

Gavin was subsequently appointed chaplain to the Italian-speaking community in the archdiocese in 2015 and chancellor in 2017. He also served as chaplain to the archdiocesan children's pilgrimage to Lourdes each Easter.

Episcopal ministry 
Gavin was appointed Bishop-elect of Cork and Ross by Pope Francis on 8 April 2019. His appointment was seen as historic, as he was the first bishop not to have previously served as auxiliary or coadjutor bishop since 1847, and the first bishop to be born outside the diocese since 1763.

Gavin was consecrated by his predecessor, John Buckley, on 30 June in the Cathedral of St Mary and St Anne, Cork.

He became the first bishop of the diocese to say a "station Mass" in November 2019.

Ahead of the publication of a pastoral letter in August 2022 which outlined a restructuring of diocesan structures, Gavin stated in an interview with The Echo that while the Catholic Church had served Ireland well in some aspects, its previously dominant role in Irish society had led to corruption and a loss of focus on mission. He also emphasised the importance of greater lay involvement over a focus on the priesthood in the process of renewal.

References

External links 

 Bishop Fintan Gavin on Catholic-Hierarchy.org
 Bishop Fintan Gavin on GCatholic

Roman Catholic bishops of Cork and Ross
Christian clergy from Dublin (city)
1966 births
Living people
21st-century Roman Catholic bishops in Ireland
Alumni of Clonliffe College
Alumni of University College Dublin
Pontifical Gregorian University alumni